M3: Malay Mo Ma-develop is a Philippine romantic comedy-drama series on ABS-CBN premiered on July 3, 2010, starring Aga Muhlach and Ai-Ai delas Alas. On November 6, 2010, the ABS-CBN network confirmed that the show has been canceled due to the low ratings compared to their other sitcoms. The final episode aired on November 27, airing a total of 22 episodes.

Synopsis
JM Benicio III is every woman's ideal man - good-looking, hardworking and successful in his structured corporate life. Yet he remains unmarried at 38. Behind JM's seemingly contented façade is actually a complicated character - perfectionist, cold, cautious and elusive of commitment. JM is bound to meet the jologs Kringkring, a single mother who'd practically grab any job in order to feed and give her son, Marcus, a better life. The odd friendship will usher Kringkring into JM's mysterious past including his unfinished business with the woman he truly loves. JM's soft spot surfaces when he starts playing a reluctant daddy to Kringkring's son. The impossible and indifferent JM will eventually break free from his past hurts and will finally realize the value of love and commitment.

Cast

Main cast
 Ai-Ai delas Alas  as Kristina Marie "Kring Kring" Dimasupil - Kringkring grew up not knowing who her father is. She was able to study but only up to 2nd year high school. She's a 'Miss Congeniality', smart ass, strong willed who knows how to get her way. She has a devil-may care attitude but has a caring heart. She will do anything for her son, Marcus.
 Aga Muhlach  as Jose Maria "JM" Benicio III - JM is an only son to the rich couple and he's his Grandfather's favorite. He grew up to be well-mannered and with proper breeding. He's perceptive to details. He dreams of becoming a good architect like his father. A family-oriented guy but this all changed when at a young age he witnessed his parents always in heated arguments for reasons he did not understand.

Supporting cast
 Megan Young as Bea Cornejo
 Tom Rodriguez as Ted Salazar
 Niña Jose as Meg
 Jojo Alejar as Mon
 Nico Antonio as Rain
 Mika dela Cruz as Ara
 Jairus Aquino as Marcus
 Noel Trinidad as Lolo Jong
 Tess Antonio as Karen

See also
 List of programs broadcast by ABS-CBN

References

External links
 M3: Malay Mo Ma-develop Teaser

ABS-CBN original programming
Philippine romantic comedy television series
2010 Philippine television series debuts
2010 Philippine television series endings
Television series by Star Creatives
Filipino-language television shows